The Evpatoria Report is the eponymous two track debut EP by Swiss post-rock band The Evpatoria Report. The album was self-released in 2003 then re-issued by Pastel Music in a bundle with Golevka in 2009.

Track listing

Personnel
The Evpatoria Report
 Laurent Quint – guitar
 Simon Robert – guitar
 David Di Lorenzo – bass
 Fabrice Berney – drums, glockenspiel
 Daniel Bacsinszky – violin, keyboard

References

2003 debut EPs
The Evpatoria Report albums
Self-released EPs